Stefan Simić (born 20 January 1995) is a Czech professional footballer who plays as a defender for Hajduk Split in the Prva HNL.

Club career
Simić entered Slavia Prague's youth ranks at the age of 6. He rose through the ranks and became the youngest player to sign a professional contract with the club, aged 15 years and 11 months. He played his first minutes for the senior side on 12 February 2011 in a friendly match against Croatian side Hajduk Split, as a part of the latter's centenary celebration, in honour of his mother's death. He left the club before making his debut in an official match, joining the youth ranks of Genoa in Italy in January 2012. The transfer reportedly cost 12 million Kč.

He played for a year and a half for Genoa Primavera side before moving to AC Milan. He was an integral part of the youth team that won the 2014 Torneo di Viareggio

In the summer of 2014 he joined the Serie B side Varese on loan and  played 17 games for the team during the season. After missing out on the first half of the 2015-16 season due to injury to his right fibula, Simić was supposed to join Hajduk Split in a six-month loan deal in January 2016. While he was already in Split to sign, he was recalled to Milan due to the injury of his teammate Philippe Mexès.

For the 2016–17 season, he was loaned out to Belgian First Division side Royal Mouscron-Péruwelz.

On 31 August 2017, he was loaned out again, this time to Serie A club Crotone.

On 24 January 2019, Simić joined  Serie A club Frosinone on loan until 30 June.

On 28 June 2019, Simić joined Croatian First Football League club Hajduk Split on a free transfer. He signed four-year contract.

International career
Simić chose to represent Czech Republic while having the possibility to play for Croatia, Serbia and Bosnia and Herzegovina, from which his parents came from, his father's ethnicity and whose passports he holds as well. He accumulated 40 caps and 1 goal between 2011 and 2014 for the Czech youth national teams, playing at U16, U17, U19, U20 and U21 levels. He did his debut for the Czechs on 11 November 2017 in a 1–0 win against Qatar.

Personal life
Simić is of Bosnian Serb and Croatian descent. His father Radoje hails from Prijedor, Bosnia and Herzegovina and his mother Suzana hails from Zagreb, Croatia. His family fled to Prague during the Croatian War of Independence before his birth. He considers himself a fan of Hajduk Split and Slavia Prague.

Career statistics

Club

Honours
Hajduk Split
 Croatian Cup: 2021–22

References

External links
Czech national team statistics at Fotbal.cz 

Living people
1995 births
Czech footballers
Czech Republic youth international footballers
Association football central defenders
Serie A players
Serie B players
Croatian Football League players
A.C. Milan players
F.C. Crotone players
S.S.D. Varese Calcio players
Frosinone Calcio players
HNK Hajduk Split players
Czech expatriate footballers
Expatriate footballers in Italy
Expatriate footballers in Croatia
Czech people of Croatian descent
Czech people of Bosnia and Herzegovina descent
Czech expatriate sportspeople in Italy
Czech expatriate sportspeople in Croatia
Czech Republic under-21 international footballers
Czech Republic international footballers
Czech people of Serbian descent
Footballers from Prague